This is a list of the number-one hits of 1971 on Italian Hit Parade Singles Chart.

Number-one artists

See also
1971 in music

References

1971 in Italian music
Italy
1971